Deborah Shumway (born 1954/1955) is an American former cycle racer who placed third in the general classification in the first Tour de France Féminin in 1984, which teammate Marianne Martin won. She competed in the race again the following year.

Shumway also featured in the 1988 movie Wheels in Motion, playing a cyclist who hopes to compete at the Olympics.

Personal life
, Shumway lives in Durango, Colorado and is married to former mountain bike racer Greg Herbold, winner of the downhill mountain biking event at the first mountain bike world championships in 1990.

References

Living people
1950s births
American female cyclists
People from Durango, Colorado
21st-century American women